Mathias Beche (born 28 June 1986 in Geneva) is a Swiss professional racing driver. He finished eighth overall and second in the LMP2 class of the 2012 24 Hours of Le Mans and is the reigning champion of the European Le Mans Series in the LMP2 class.

Career
After starting in karting, Beche began racing in single-seaters in Asia in 2007 when he contested the Asian Formula Renault Challenge, finishing fifth overall with one win. The following year he took part in Formula Asia 2.0 where he ended up runner-up to Felix Rosenqvist.

2009 saw Beche switch to sportscar racing, finishing third in Formula Le Mans. In 2010 he contested four Le Mans Series rounds; three in the FLM class and one in GT1 in a Ford GT. He then entered the last two rounds of the FIA GT3 European Championship, also in a Ford.

In 2011 Beche competed in the full Le Mans Series season in an LMP2 Oreca 03 for TDS Racing with Pierre Thiriet and Jody Firth. The trio won the rounds at Spa and Estoril and finished fourth in the final drivers' standings. Beche also drove in the FIA GT1 World Championship round at Zolder in a Ford.

For 2012, LMP2 became the top class of the renamed European Le Mans Series. Partnering Thiriet at TDS, Beche won the opening round of the season at Paul Ricard and the season finale at Road Atlanta, securing his first major championship victory. For the 2012 24 Hours of Le Mans they were joined by Christophe Tinseau and the car finished eighth overall and second in LMP2.

Racing record

Complete European Le Mans Series results
(key) (Races in bold indicate pole position) (Races in italics indicate fastest lap)

Complete FIA World Endurance Championship results
(key) (Races in bold indicate pole position) (Races in italics indicate fastest lap)

† Non World Endurance Championship entries are ineligible to score points.
* Season still in progress.

24 Hours of Le Mans results

Complete IMSA SportsCar Championship results
(key) (Races in bold indicate pole position) (Races in italics indicate fastest lap)

Complete Super GT results
(key) (Races in bold indicate pole position) (Races in italics indicate fastest lap)

References

External links

1986 births
Living people
Sportspeople from Geneva
Swiss racing drivers
French racing drivers
FIA GT1 World Championship drivers
European Le Mans Series drivers
24 Hours of Le Mans drivers
American Le Mans Series drivers
FIA World Endurance Championship drivers
Swiss-French people
Blancpain Endurance Series drivers
24 Hours of Spa drivers
Asian Le Mans Series drivers
WeatherTech SportsCar Championship drivers
24H Series drivers
Formula V6 Asia drivers
Asian Formula Renault Challenge drivers
Morand Racing drivers
TDS Racing drivers
JDC Motorsports drivers
Rebellion Racing drivers
Manor Motorsport drivers
Phoenix Racing drivers
Asia Racing Team drivers
Alan Docking Racing drivers
Le Mans Cup drivers
Craft-Bamboo Racing drivers